FO Bytča is a Slovak association football club located in Bytča. It currently plays in 3. Liga.

Colors and badge 
Its colors are blue and white or also red.

References

External links 

 Official website 
 Futbalnet profile 
 Bytča sport-blog 

Football clubs in Slovakia
Association football clubs established in 1912
FO Bytca